Louis Henry (German: Ludwig Heinrich) (11 October 1640 - 3 January 1674) was the Count Palatine of Simmern-Kaiserslautern from 1653 until 1673.

Life
Louis Henry was born in 1640 as the only surviving son of Louis Philip, Count Palatine of Simmern-Kaiserslautern. He succeeded his father in 1655, and was under the regency of his mother, Marie Eleonore von Brandenburg, till 1658. He retired from ruling in 1673. He died less than a year later, and was buried in the St-Stephan's Church in Simmern.

Marriage
Louis Henry married Maria of Orange-Nassau (5 September 1642 - 20 March 1688) in 1666, daughter of the Dutch prince Frederick Henry. The marriage remained childless.

References

Literature 
 Felix Joseph Lipowsky: Karl Ludwig Churfürst von der Pfalz. Seidel, 1824, S. 53
 Heinrich August Pierer: Universal-lexikon der gegenwart und vergangenheit: oder, Neuestes encyclopädisches wörterbuch der wissenschaften, künste und gewerbe, bearb von mehr als 220 gelehrten, Band 18, H. A. Pierer, 1843, S. 148 Digital version

1640 births
1674 deaths
House of Palatinate-Simmern